Ulises Váldez (born 14 April 1948) is a Cuban former cyclist. He competed in the individual road race and the tandem events at the 1968 Summer Olympics.

References

External links
 

1948 births
Living people
Cuban male cyclists
Olympic cyclists of Cuba
Cyclists at the 1968 Summer Olympics
People from Villa Clara Province